The 2009 New Jersey General Assembly elections were held on November 3, 2009 for all 80 seats in the lower house of the New Jersey Legislature.  Voters in New Jersey's 40 legislative districts cast 4,204,034 votes. Each voter may cast up to two votes. The Democratic Party won a 47-seat majority while losing the popular vote. The Republican Party won a majority of votes cast but received only a 33-seat minority, an increase of 1 seat from their 2007 election results. The election coincided with a gubernatorial election where Democratic incumbent Governor Jon Corzine was defeated by Republican challenger Chris Christie.

Election results

District 1

District 2

District 3

District 4

District 5

District 6

District 7

District 8

District 9

District 10

District 11

District 12

District 13

District 14

District 15

District 16

District 17

District 18

District 19

District 20

District 21

District 22

District 23

District 24

District 25

District 26

District 27

District 28

District 29

District 30

District 31

District 32

District 33

District 34

District 35

District 36

District 37

District 38

District 39

District 40

See also
2009 New Jersey elections

Sources
Official 2009 General Assembly Election Results

2009 New Jersey elections
New Jersey General Assembly elections
New Jersey General Assembly